In mathematics, the convergence condition by Courant–Friedrichs–Lewy is a necessary condition for convergence while solving certain partial differential equations (usually hyperbolic PDEs) numerically. It arises in the numerical analysis of explicit time integration schemes, when these are used for the numerical solution. As a consequence, the time step must be less than a certain time in many explicit time-marching computer simulations, otherwise the simulation produces incorrect results. The condition is named after Richard Courant, Kurt Friedrichs, and Hans Lewy who described it in their 1928 paper.

Heuristic description
The principle behind the condition is that, for example, if a wave is moving across a discrete spatial grid and we want to compute its amplitude at discrete time steps of equal duration, then this duration must be less than the time for the wave to travel to adjacent grid points. As a corollary, when the grid point separation is reduced, the upper limit for the time step also decreases. In essence, the numerical domain of dependence of any point in space and time (as determined by initial conditions and the parameters of the approximation scheme) must include the analytical domain of dependence (wherein the initial conditions have an effect on the exact value of the solution at that point) to assure that the scheme can access the information required to form the solution.

Statement
To make a reasonably formally precise statement of the condition, it is necessary to define the following quantities:
Spatial coordinate: one of the coordinates of the physical space in which the problem is posed
Spatial dimension of the problem: the number  of spatial dimensions, i.e., the number of spatial coordinates of the physical space where the problem is posed.
Time: the coordinate, acting as a parameter, which describes the evolution of the system, distinct from the spatial coordinates
The spatial coordinates and the time are discrete-valued independent variables, which are placed at regular distances called the interval length  and the time step, respectively. Using these names, the CFL condition relates the length of the time step to a function of the interval lengths of each spatial coordinate and of the maximum speed that information can travel in the physical space.

Operatively, the CFL condition is commonly prescribed for those terms of the finite-difference approximation of general partial differential equations that model the advection phenomenon.

The one-dimensional case
For the one-dimensional case, the continuous-time model equation (that is usually solved for ) is:
 

The CFL condition then has the following form:
 

where the dimensionless number  is called the Courant number,

 is the magnitude of the velocity (whose dimension is length/time)
 is the time step (whose dimension is time)
 is the length interval (whose dimension is length).

The value of  changes with the method used to solve the discretised equation, especially depending on whether the method is explicit or implicit. If an explicit (time-marching) solver is used then typically . Implicit (matrix) solvers are usually less sensitive to numerical instability and so larger values of  may be tolerated.

The two and general n-dimensional case
In the two-dimensional case, the CFL condition becomes

with the obvious meanings of the symbols involved. By analogy with the two-dimensional case, the general CFL condition for the -dimensional case is the following one:

The interval length is not required to be the same for each spatial variable . This "degree of freedom" can be used to somewhat optimize the value of the time step for a particular problem, by varying the values of the different interval to keep it not too small.

Notes

References 
.
.: translated from the German by Phyllis Fox. This is an earlier version of the paper , circulated as a research report.
. A freely downloadable copy can be found here.

 Carlos A. de Moura and Carlos S. Kubrusly (Eds.): "The Courant-Friedrichs-Lewy (CFL) Condition: 80 Years After Its Discovery", Birkhauser, ISBN 978-0-8176-8393-1 (2013).

External links 

Numerical differential equations
Computational fluid dynamics